Ray Wilson (born 22 May 1944) is a British figure skater. He competed in the pairs event at the 1968 Winter Olympics.

References

External links
 

1944 births
Living people
British male pair skaters
Olympic figure skaters of Great Britain
Figure skaters at the 1968 Winter Olympics
Sportspeople from London